Senator Higgins may refer to:

Anthony Higgins (politician) (1840–1912), U.S. Senator from Delaware
Carlisle W. Higgins (1889–1980), North Carolina State Senate
Frank W. Higgins (1856–1907), New York State Senate
James A. Higgins (1889–1962), New York State Senate
Leon F. Higgins (fl. 1900s–1920s), Maine State Senate
Linda Higgins (born 1950), Minnesota State Senate
William L. Higgins (1867–1951), Connecticut State Senate